The Muppandal Wind Farm is India's largest operational onshore wind farm. This project located in Kanyakumari district, Tamil Nadu. The project was developed by Tamil Nadu Energy Development Agency. Its installed capacity is 1,500 MW, which makes it the 3rd-largest operational onshore wind farm in the world.

See also

Wind power in India
List of largest power stations in the world
List of onshore wind farms

References

Kanyakumari district
Wind farms in Tamil Nadu
1986 establishments in Tamil Nadu
Energy infrastructure completed in 1986